In the mathematical field of graph theory, the Meredith graph is a 4-regular undirected graph with 70 vertices and 140 edges discovered by Guy H. J. Meredith in 1973. 

The Meredith graph is 4-vertex-connected and 4-edge-connected, has chromatic number 3, chromatic index 5, radius 7, diameter 8, girth 4 and is non-hamiltonian. It has book thickness 3 and queue number 2.

Published in 1973, it provides a counterexample to the Crispin Nash-Williams conjecture that every 4-regular 4-vertex-connected graph is Hamiltonian. However, W. T. Tutte showed that all 4-connected planar graphs are hamiltonian.

Gallery

References 

Individual graphs
Regular graphs